Pseudohalocynthiibacter is a Gram-negative, aerobic and non-motile genus of bacteria from the family of Rhodobacteraceae with one known species (Pseudohalocynthiibacter aestuariivivens). Pseudohalocynthiibacter aestuariivivens has been isolated from a tidal flat sediments from the South Sea in Korea.

References

Rhodobacteraceae
Bacteria genera
Monotypic bacteria genera